

Given name 
Mirella is a feminine given name which may refer to:

Mirella Amato, bilingual beer consultant, beer sommelier and author in Toronto, Ontario, Canada
Mirella Arnhold (born 1983), Brazilian alpine skier
Mirella Avalle (born 1922), Italian sprinter
Mirella Bentivoglio (1922–2017), Italian sculptor, poet, performance artist and curator
Mirella Cesa (born 1984), Ecuadorian singer who has won several awards and been called the "mother of Andipop"
Mirella Levi D'Ancona (1919–2014), Italian-born American art historian and professor.
Mirella D'Angelo (born 1956), Italian actress
Mirella Freni (born 1935), Italian soprano whose repertoire includes Verdi, Puccini, Mozart and Tchaikovsky
Mirella Gregori (born 1967), a woman who mysteriously disappeared from Rome in May 1983
Mirella Harju (born 1982), Finnish former racing cyclist
Mirella Latorre (1919–2010), Chilean radio and television actress
Mirella Maniani-Tzelili (born 1976), retired Greek track and field athlete who competed in the javelin throw
Mirella van Melis (born 1979), retired female track and road racing cyclist from the Netherlands
Mirella Papaeconomou, Greek television screenwriter
Mirella Parutto (born 1936), Italian operatic soprano and later mezzo-soprano
Mirella Ricciardi (born 1931), Kenyan-born photographer and author

See also
Neodiplocampta mirella, a species of bee flies in the family Bombyliidae
Mirela
Mirellia

Feminine given names